A sailor sandwich is a hot meat and cheese sandwich popular at Jewish delis in Richmond, Virginia, area restaurants. Its core ingredients are hot pastrami, grilled knackwurst, melted Swiss cheese and hot mustard on rye bread.

Origins
The New York Deli, a Jewish deli founded in 1929, claims to be the originator of the sailor sandwich. According to local legend, during World War II, Navy seamen from the University of Richmond Navy V-12 program would frequent the New York Deli and order this then-nameless sandwich. It eventually became known as a sailor sandwich, although it is uncertain who officially named the sandwich.

Variations

The marine sandwich is popular around some Marine bases like MCB Quantico. It is usually served on Italian bread with knackwurst, pastrami or salami and uses Jewish-style mustard and comes with peppers. The West Coast version often includes sliced tomatoes on the side. 
C.2014, Capital Ale House in Glen Allen, VA had a Sailor Sandwich on their menu. A frequent patron disliked rye bread, and requested the sandwich on the restaurant's own pretzel bread. The new variation was adopted by the establishment as the "Admiral", though never credited to its inaugural customer.

In popular culture
 Patricia Cornwell, whose Kay Scarpetta novels often take place in the Richmond area, included characters ordering and eating sailor sandwiches in Cause of Death and Cruel and Unusual.
 In Guy Fieri's book, Diners, Drive-ins and Dives: An All-American Road Trip, the chapter on Virginia features Dot's Back Inn in Richmond as a place to get a sailor sandwich. Dot's Back Inn and the sailor sandwich were featured in an episode of Diners, Drive-Ins and Dives filmed in 2007.

See also

 List of American sandwiches
 List of sandwiches

References

American sandwiches
Jewish American cuisine
Cheese sandwiches
Jewish cuisine
Richmond, Virginia
Rye-based dishes